The 2013 Chinese Artistic Gymnastics Championships were held from 8 May to 12 May 2013 in Dalian.

Men's event medal winners

Women's event medal winners

Women's All-Around Qualification

Women's Team Final

Women's All-Around Final

Vault

Uneven Bars

Balance Beam

Floor Exercise

Medal count

2013 in gymnastics
2013 in Chinese sport
2013
May 2013 sports events in China